Tsolga (Suulga) is a rural locality (an ulus) in Mukhorshibirsky District, Republic of Buryatia, Russia. The population was 737 as of 2010. There are 19 streets.

Geography 
Tsolga is located 46 km west of Mukhorshibir (the district's administrative centre) by road. Balta is the nearest rural locality.

References 

Rural localities in Mukhorshibirsky District